Charles Edward  Peek (13 April 1904 – 21 December 1988) was a New Zealand teacher, child welfare administrator and billiards player. He was born in Picton, Marlborough, New Zealand in 1904.

References

1904 births
1988 deaths
People from Picton, New Zealand
New Zealand schoolteachers